The Auction Mart is a 1920 British silent drama film directed by Duncan McRae and starring Gertrude McCoy, Charles Quatermaine and Gerald Moore.

Cast
 Gertrude McCoy as Jacqueline  
 Charles Quatermaine as Jacqueline's Father 
 Gerald Moore as Basil Stair 
 Basil Foster as Carver  
 Simeon Stuart as a Peer  
 Moya Nugent 
 Henry Doughty
 Minnie Rayner

References

Bibliography
 Low, Rachael. History of the British Film, 1918-1929. George Allen & Unwin, 1971.

External links

1920 films
1920 drama films
British silent feature films
British drama films
Films based on British novels
British black-and-white films
1920s English-language films
1920s British films
Silent drama films